Església de Sant Romà de les Bons  is a church located in Les Bons, Encamp Parish, Andorra. It is a heritage property registered in the Cultural Heritage of Andorra. It was built in 1164.

References

Churches completed in 1163
12th-century churches
Encamp
Roman Catholic churches in Andorra
Cultural Heritage of Andorra